was a Japanese businessman and served as president of Daiei Film. The self-proclaimed creator of Gamera, he produced the kaiju's second film Gamera vs. Barugon, with the remainder of the Showa Gamera films produced instead by his son Hidemasa Nagata.

Film career
Born in Kyoto, Nagata attended the Ōkura Kōtō Shōgyō Gakkō (now Tokyo Keizai University), but left before graduating. He joined the Nikkatsu studio in 1925 and, after working as a location manager, rose to become head of production at the Kyoto studio. Experiencing conflicts with the Nikkatsu president, he left the company in 1934, taking many Nikkatsu stars with him, to form Daiichi Eiga. While short-lived, that studio created such masterpieces as Kenji Mizoguchi's Sisters of the Gion (1936) and Osaka Elegy (1936). When Daiichi Eiga folded, Nagata became head of the Kyoto studio of Shinkō Kinema until the government reorganized the industry during World War Two. Against a government plan to combine the fiction film companies into two studios, Nagata fought hard for the alternative option of creating a third studio. His efforts resulted in the creation of the Daiei Motion Picture Company, where he first served as an executive. He rose to become president in 1947 and, apart from a brief period when he was purged by Occupation authorities, remained in that position until 1971.

Under his reign, Daiei produced Akira Kurosawa's Rashomon (1950) and entered it in the Venice Film Festival, where it won the grand prize and became the first Japanese film to win an international award, thus introducing Japanese cinema to the world. Nagata also spurred the production of Teinosuke Kinugasa's Gate of Hell (1953), the first Japanese color film to be shown abroad, earning both an honorary Academy Award for Best Foreign Language Film and the Palme d'Or at the Cannes Film Festival. Nagata also produced such renowned films as Mizoguchi's Ugetsu (1953) and Sansho the Bailiff (1954), as well as Jokyo (which was entered into the 10th Berlin International Film Festival). On the popular front, Nagata's Daiei was also known for such successful film series as the Zatoichi films starring Shintaro Katsu, the Sleepy Eyes of Death series featuring Raizō Ichikawa, and the Gamera movies.

Due to the decline of the film industry, and Nagata's extravagant expenditures, Daiei went bankrupt in 1971, but he continued as an independent producer for some years after that. He produced more than 160 films during his career.

Baseball
During the age when many Japanese film studios owned professional baseball teams, Nagata served as owner first of the Daiei Stars, and then of the Daimai Orions when the Stars merged with the Mainichi Orions in 1958. He promoted the two-league system, helped build Tokyo Stadium, and became the first president of the Pacific League in Japan. He was inducted into the Japanese Baseball Hall of Fame in 1988.

Selected filmography

 Sisters of the Gion (1936)
 Osaka Elegy (1936)
 Rashomon (1950)
 Miss Oyu (1951)
 Tetsu no tsume (1951) aka Claws of Steel
 The Tale of Genji (1951)
 Ugetsu (1953) aka Tales of Ugetsu
 Gate of Hell (1953)
 Sansho the Bailiff (1954)
 The Crucified Lovers (1954)
 Princess Yang Kwei-Fei (1955)
 The Phantom Horse (1955)
 Shin Heike Monogatari (1955)
 Warning from Space (1956)
 Street of Shame (1956)
 Zangiku monogatari (1956)
 Suzakumon (1957)
 The Loyal 47 Ronin (1958)
 The Snowy Heron (1958)
 Enjō (1958)
 Floating Weeds (1959)
 Fires on the Plain (1959)
 Odd Obsession (1959)
 Jokyo (1960)
 Her Brother (1960)
 An Actor's Revenge (1963)
 Gamera (1965)
 The Hoodlum Soldier (1965)
 Shiroi Kyotō (1966)
 Gamera vs. Barugon (1966)
 Zatoichi the Outlaw (1967)
 Nichiren (1979)

Bibliography

References

External links

1906 births
1985 deaths
Japanese film producers
Deaths from pneumonia in Japan
Baseball executives
Film studio executives
People from Kyoto
Recipients of the Medal with Purple Ribbon